Oosterwolde is the largest town in the municipality of Ooststellingwerf in the east of Friesland, the Netherlands.

The town was first mentioned between 1325 and 1336 as "tot Oesterwolde", and means eastern forest. Oosterwolde developed between two brinks (communal pastures). The Dutch Reformed church was built in 1735 as a replacement of a medieval church. 

Oosterwolde was home to 548 people in 1840. In 1886, Oosterwolde became the capital of the municipality of Ooststellingwerf. In 1887, Frico (nowadays: FrieslandCampina) opened a dairy factory in the village. The cooperative purchasing agency "Oosterwolde" opened factory in 1915 which is a combination of rational and Jugendstil architecture.

Gallery

References

Geography of Ooststellingwerf
Populated places in Friesland